The 1957–58 Arkansas Razorbacks men's basketball team represented the University of Arkansas in the 1957–58 college basketball season. The Razorbacks played their home games in Barnhill Arena (then known as Razorback Fieldhouse) in Fayetteville, Arkansas. Arkansas competed in the Southwest Conference. It was former Razorback All-American Glen Rose's sixth season in his second stint as head coach of the Hogs and fifteenth season overall as Arkansas's coach. The Razorbacks tied for the Southwest Conference championship with a record of 9–5 against SWC teams and 17–10 overall. Arkansas earned the SWC's bid to the NCAA tournament, but lost both its second-round game and regional consolation match. The Oklahoma State team that beat Arkansas in the Sweet Sixteen featured future Razorback head coach Eddie Sutton at point guard.

1958 was Arkansas's fourteenth SWC Championship and its fifth NCAA Tournament appearance. Glen Rose won his fifth SWC championship as coach of the Razorbacks and the only conference championship of his second tenure as head coach. Arkansas was ranked in the AP Poll for the second time in program history on January 20, 1958. The Hogs were ranked for consecutive weeks for the first time ever when they were ranked for three straight weeks before losing to Rice and falling out of the polls. Senior Fred Grim was named First Team All-SWC, First Team All-District, and AP All-American Honorable Mention. Grim was drafted in the fifth round of the 1958 NBA Draft by the Syracuse Nationals.

Roster
Roster retrieved from HogStats.com.

Schedule and Results
Schedule retrieved from HogStats.com.

|-
!colspan=12 style=|Regular season

|-
!colspan=12 style=|  NCAA Tournament

References

Arkansas Razorbacks
Arkansas Razorbacks men's basketball seasons
Arkansas